The Ten Thousand Doors of January is a 2019 fantasy novel by Alix E. Harrow. It is the Hugo Award-nominated writer's debut novel.

Plot synopsis 
At the beginning of the 20th century, January Scaller lives in a big mansion with her guardian, Cornelius Locke. What may seem to be a privileged existence is marred by the strict rules imposed on the red-skinned girl, the meager living quarters assigned to her, and the fact that her father, Julian, who works for Locke, is almost never around.

When she was seven, January discovered a magic door, which was then destroyed. Her guardian convinces her it was only her imagination, and determines to raise her to be a "proper" lady. Locke entertains his fellows from the New England Archeological Society, and these men treat January as a curiosity, sometimes making her feel vaguely threatened. January often explores the artifacts kept throughout the mansion, convinced her father—who is distant even when he is home from hunting special artifacts for Locke—is leaving items for her in a chest, in order to communicate with her. She becomes concerned when he fails to return from his most recent trip.

January's only companions are Jane, an African mystery woman sent by Julian to be her companion and protector, and Bad, short for Sinbad, her loyal dog. When she was younger, she was friends with Samuel Zappia, the grocer's boy, but as she grew older the contact between them fizzled out.

When January finds a special book in the chest, The Ten Thousand Doors, she is more than intrigued. The book tells of a young woman from the South who meets a young man who comes through a mysterious door. Though the encounter is brief, the girl is completely enamored. When she returns to the spot again, she finds the door burnt down. She becomes determined to find her young man by exploring the world to find another door.

At the start, January believes the work is fiction. But when Locke tells her that Julian is dead, she sparks her latent power to bend reality to her will through the written word. She uses her power to escape what has now become an acutely dangerous situation with Locke and his cohort, and embarks on an entirely unexpected adventure with Jane, Samuel and Bad. It turns out that her story and the story in her book are intertwined, and that the thousands of doors are real, scattered all over our world, each connecting to another world.

Reception 
The Ten Thousand Doors Of January was a Los Angeles Times best seller.

In her NPR review, Jessica P. Wick enthuses that you will "want to open every one of 'The Ten Thousand Doors Of January'", calling the novel both bewitching and satisfying. She lauds how Harrow "explores privilege and race, class and power, control, imperialism, the desire for order, the desire for hope, community, home, what it is to be an exile, what it is to be afraid,," adding that "stories provide strength and escape in The Ten Thousand Doors of January, but Harrow doesn't neglect to show us how the stories we're told can trap us, too. For a novel so grand in scope, it manages to stay intimate."

Kirkus Reviews called The Ten Thousand Doors Of January "a love letter to imagination, adventure, the written word, and the power of many kinds of love." The review compliments the diverse cast of characters as well as the strong woman lead, noting that "this portal fantasy doesn’t shy away from racism, classism, and sexism, which helps it succeed as an interesting story."

Awards and Nominations

Major awards

Locus awards and polls 
 Locus Award for Best First Novel (2020) – Nominee (3rd Place)

Other awards, juried (or voted by members of the society) 
 Compton Crook Award (2020) – Nominee (Finalist)
 The Kitschies for Golden Tentacle (Debut) (2020) – Nominee
 Mythopoeic Awards (2020) – Nominee
 William L. Crawford IAFA Fantasy Award for First Fantasy Book – Nominee (Shortlisted)

Specialty awards 
 Audie Award for Fantasy (2020) – Winner
 Featured in the Audie Award for Best Female Narration (2020) – Nominee

Public opinion 
 Goodreads Choice Award for Favorite Debut Novel (2019) – 4th Place
 Goodreads Choice Award for Favorite Fantasy Novel (2019) – 11th Place
 BookNest Award for Best Debut Novel (2019) – Nominee (Shortlisted)

References

External links 

 The Ten Thousand Doors of January on Hatchette Books

2019 fantasy novels
2019 American novels
2019 debut novels
Debut fantasy novels
Novels set in Vermont